Richard Gilroy Swan (born 6 December 1951) is a former Scottish cricketer.

Swan was educated at St. Mary's School, Melrose, Merchiston Castle School, Edinburgh, and Durham University.  He played for Durham University cricket team when they won the 1972 University Athletics Union (UAU) title.

References

External links
Richard Swan at ESPNcricinfo
Richard Swan at CricketArchive

1951 births
Living people
Sportspeople from the Scottish Borders
People educated at St. Mary's School, Melrose
People educated at Merchiston Castle School
Scottish cricketers
Scottish cricket captains
Alumni of the College of the Venerable Bede, Durham